Gabriel Jabbour (Arabic: غبريال جبّور) (7 November 1922 – 20 September 1987) was a French actor.

He made his debut in acting in 1957 in L'affaire Sarret-Schmidt on television. Between then and 1987 he made almost 70 appearances in film and TV with his career at its peak in the 1970s.

In 1981 Jabbour appeared in the thriller series Affaire Labricole, L.

He retired from acting in 1987.

Partial filmography 

 Goha (1958) - Sayed Khamis
 Suivez-moi jeune homme (1958) - Chauffeur de taxi
 The Burning Court (1962) - Le Bijoutier
 La Poupée (1962) - Joachim
 Trafics dans l'ombre (1964) - Lamorie
 Les pieds dans le plâtre (1965) - M. Gaby
 Mazel Tov ou le Mariage (1968) - M. Avram
 Z (1969) - Bozzini (uncredited)
 Jeff (1969) - Zucci
 Et qu'ça saute! (1970)
 Donkey Skin (1970) - Le chef des tailleurs
 Le Viager (1972) - M. Levasseur, le patron de Martinet
 The Bar at the Crossing (1972) - Mosé
 Far West (1973) - Véronique
 O.K. patron (1974) - Aram Kampessian
 Un nuage entre les dents (1974) - Casenave
 Le trouble-fesses (1976) - Le droguiste
 Body of My Enemy (1976) - Blome
 The Porter from Maxim's (1976) - L'ambassadeur
 La nuit de Saint-Germain-des-Prés (1977) - Brandonnel
 Dear Inspector (1977) - Le médecin Légiste
 Madame Rosa (1977) - Monsieur Hamil
 La nuit, tous les chats sont gris (1977) - Monsieur Banalesco
 Et vive la liberté! (1978)
 State Reasons (1978) - Meslan
 Womanlight (1979) - Sacha
 La flambeuse (1981) - Le professeur
 Julien Fontanes, magistrat (1981, TV Series) - Vestria
 Le secret des sélénites (1983) - (voice)
 Three Men and a Cradle (1985) - Le supérieur
 La galette du roi (1986) - le prince arabe Abdallah Ibn

External links

1922 births
1987 deaths
French male television actors
French male film actors
French people of Lebanese descent
20th-century French male actors